The LSU Tigers track and field team represents Louisiana State University in NCAA Division I men's indoor and outdoor track and field.

History

LSU men's track and field had its beginning in 1897. The Tigers have won a total of 6 NCAA championships (2 indoor, 4 outdoor).

In the early history of the program, the team won six Southern Intercollegiate Athletic Association titles between 1913 and 1922.  During its short period of membership in the Southern Intercollegiate Conference (now known as the Southern Conference) the team also won three consecutive conference titles.

In 1933 the school joined the Southeastern Conference and the track & field team wasted no time making a name for itself, winning the inaugural SEC track & field title as well as the NCAA Men's Outdoor Track and Field Championship, the first NCAA championship in any sport for LSU. LSU men's track & field program won back-to-back NCAA outdoor titles in 1989 and 1990 and they won their 4th outdoor title in 2002.

In 2001, the Tigers won their first indoor NCAA title and their second indoor title in 2004.

Team Finishes

Bold indicates NCAA national championship
Source:

NCAA Championships

Team

Event

Indoor

Source:

Outdoor

Source:

Stadiums

Carl Maddox Field House

Carl Maddox Field House built in 1975 is the indoor track and field home arena for the LSU Tigers and LSU Lady Tigers track and field teams. The arena has a seating capacity of 3,000. The field house features a 200-meter unbanked track, elevated jump runways, a variety of throwing areas and multiple high jump and vaulting areas. In 1998, the arena was renamed in honor of former LSU Athletic Director Carl Maddox.

Bernie Moore Track Stadium

Bernie Moore Track Stadium built in 1969 is the outdoor track and field home stadium for the LSU Tigers and LSU Lady Tigers track and field teams. The stadium has a seating capacity of 5,680. In 1971, the stadium was renamed after former LSU football and track & field coach, Bernie Moore.  Moore coached the LSU Track and Field teams for 18 years (1930–47) and led the Tigers to their first NCAA National Championship in 1933 as well as 12 SEC crowns.

Training facilities

Bernie Moore Track Stadium weight room
Opened in January 2003, the weight room is for the LSU Tigers track and field and LSU Lady Tigers track and field team's. The LSU track and field weight room is a 2,000 square foot facility designed for an Olympic style lifting program. Located adjacent to the track, the weight room features 10 multi-purpose power stations, 5 dumbbell stations, 4 power racks, 5 sets of competition plates, 10 competition Olympic bars, 2 multi-purpose racks, an assortment of selectorized machines and 2 televisions for multimedia presentations.

Head coaches

References

External links
 

 
Sports clubs established in 1933
1933 establishments in Louisiana